Iraq Veterans Against the War (IVAW) is an advocacy group of formerly active-duty United States military personnel, Iraq War veterans, Afghanistan War veterans, and other veterans who have served since the September 11, 2001 attacks; who were opposed to the U.S. military invasion and occupation in Iraq from 2003 to 2011.  The organization advocated the immediate withdrawal of all coalition forces in Iraq, and  reparations paid to the Iraqi people.  It also provides support services for returning veterans to include health care and mental health.

Membership
The membership is composed of American military veterans, active-duty service personnel from all branches of the military, and U.S. National Guard members and reservists who have served since September 11, 2001.  Prospective members are required to provide proof of military service.

The group was founded in July 2004, with much controversy due to its exclusion of Desert Storm veterans, who most obviously had served in Iraq, and were opposed to war.  Desert Storm veteran Dennis Kyne spoke at the opening session during the Veterans for Peace (VFP) convention against this separation.  To date, veterans who served in Iraq before the re-invasion in 2003 have still not been invited to membership.  The group formed at the annual Veterans for Peace convention in Boston, with guidance from Vietnam Veterans Against the War (VVAW) seven veterans: former Executive Director Kelly Dougherty (U.S. Army), Tim Goodrich (U.S. Air Force), Mike Hoffman (U.S. Marine Corps), Alex Ryabov (U.S. Marine Corps), Jimmy Massey (U.S. Marine Corps), Isaiah Pallos (U.S. Marine Corps), and Diana Morrison (U.S. Army).

By 2008, the majority of the founding members had separated from the organization.

By 2010, About Face had 61 chapters around the United States; one in Toronto, Canada, made up of war resisters; and a chapter in Germany, five of which are on active duty military bases.  The six active duty chapters are on Fort Drum, New York; Fort Meade, Maryland; Fort Lewis, Washington; Fort Hood, Texas; Lawton-Fort Sill, Oklahoma; and Camp Lejeune and MCAS Cherry Point, North Carolina.  Members of the organization reside in all 50 U.S. states, Washington, D.C., Canada, Europe, and on numerous bases overseas, including bases in Iraq and Afghanistan.  Membership is currently over 1,800 persons.

Truth in Recruiting
About Face has actively participated in a nationwide Truth in Recruiting campaign aimed at countering alleged misconceptions of military service propagated by recruiters.  Currently, many About Face members are involved in "equal access" policies at high schools across the country.

Stop-loss policy
About Face has protested the military's stop-loss policy, which is an extension of soldiers' Active Duty service period by the Department of Defense.  All service members sign up for a minimum of eight years of total service, a portion of which (generally around four years) is served in the Inactive Ready Reserve.  The Defense Department may recall members from inactive service as noted in their enlistment contracts.  Several tower-guard vigils against the stop-loss have been held in various places including Colorado Springs, Colorado; Bellingham, Washington; and Washington D.C.

Winter Soldier: Iraq & Afghanistan

Winter Soldier: Iraq & Afghanistan was an event in Washington, D.C. in March 2008, run by About Face, at which U.S. veterans spoke about their experiences during the Iraq War and the War in Afghanistan (2001–present). It was inspired by the similar 1971 event put on by Vietnam Veterans Against the War (VVAW).

Action following Fort Hood shooting
Following the Fort Hood shooting of November 5, 2009, Michael Kern, former President of the Fort Hood About Face chapter attempted to hand President Obama a statement from the organization, when the President visited his barracks at Fort Hood on November 10.  The statement in part demanded that the military radically overhaul its mental health care system, and halt the practice of repeated deployment of the same troops.

In August 2010, members of the About Face took part in protesting the deployment of the 3rd ACR as the troops were leaving for Iraq.  During the protest, at least one person tried to stand in front of the buses carrying the troops.

Refuge in Canada
A majority of Canadians are of the view that U.S. war resisters who had fled to Canada to avoid having to serve in Iraq should be able to remain in Canada.  The Canadian parliament is considering an amendment to the Immigration and Refugee Protection Act, which would provide legal sanctuary for U.S. war resisters.

See also
Winter Soldier: Iraq & Afghanistan
List of veterans critical of the Iraq War
Gold Star Families for Peace
Vietnam Veterans Against the War
The Ground Truth
Coffee Strong, a GI coffeehouse
Under the Hood Café, a GI coffeehouse
Diplomats and Military Commanders for Change
Families of the Fallen for Change
List of anti-war organizations
List of peace activists
Stephen Funk
Robin Long
Camilo Mejia
Adam Kokesh

References

External links

War Is Not a Game, by Nan Levinson
An interview with Mike Hoffman, co-founder of Iraq Veterans Against the War.
U.S. Troops in Iraq: 72% Say End War in 2006
Citizens' Hearing on the Legality of U.S. Actions in Iraq: The Case of Lt. Ehren Watada, Tacoma, WA, Jan. 20-21, 2007
Coffee Strong, G.I. coffeehouse project of G.I. Voice next to Fort Lewis, WA
A Soldier's Heart, PBS Frontline
Memorial Day Special, Winter Soldier on the Hill: War Vets Testify Before Congress — video by Democracy Now!
Members of IVAW from Ft. Hood on Rag Radio — interviewed by Thorne Dreyer (55:42)
Articles about IVAW on The Rag Blog
Under the Hood GI Cafe, Killeen, Texas
Iraq Veterans Against the War (IVAW) — testimony in Virginia
Iraq Veterans Against the War Oral History Collection — Tamiment Library & Robert F. Wagner Labor Archives at New York University Special Collections

Political advocacy groups in the United States
Veterans' organizations opposed to the Iraq War
Organizations established in 2004
American military personnel of the Iraq War
United States Army soldiers